Martensdorf is a railway station in the village of Martensdorf, Mecklenburg-Vorpommern, Germany. The station lies on the Rostock-Stralsund railway and the train services are operated by Ostdeutsche Eisenbahn GmbH.

Train services
The station is served by the following services:
regional express (RE 9) Rostock - Velgast - Stralsund - Lietzow - Sassnitz/Binz
regional express (RE 10) Rostock - Velgast - Stralsund - Züssow

References 

Railway stations in Mecklenburg-Western Pomerania
Railway stations in Germany opened in 1885